The Mehsana District Cooperative Milk Producers' Union Limited, popularly known as Dudhsagar Dairy, is a division of Gujarat Cooperative Milk Marketing Federation which is under the ownership of Ministry of Cooperation of the Government of Gujarat. 

Dudhsagar Dairy is the second largest dairy in Asia, processing on an average  of milk each day. It has established a network for procuring milk from 500,000 milk producers through 1150 village milk cooperatives.

Today, Dudhsagar Dairy has a membership of over 520,000 dairy farmers. Its consolidated turnover in 2012–13 was more than Rs. 34 billion.

The union is ISO 9001:2000, ISO 14000:2004, and ISO 22000:2005 certified and is an environment-friendly organization.

History

A cooperative movement, on the lines of Amul-model, initiated in Mehsana, organized the rural milk producers, encouraging them to pull together their resources. On 8 November 1960, Dudhsagar dairy was registered under Mumbai Co-operative societies act, 1925. Shri Mansinhbhai Pruthviraj Patel laid the foundation stone on 2 April 1963.

Gujarat Cooperative Milk Marketing Federation Ltd. (GCMMF) is a body of Dairy Cooperatives in Gujarat. Thirteen dairy cooperatives work under GCMMF. Mehsana District Cooperative Milk Producer's Union Limited is also a part of GCMMF, and it contributes the highest amount of milk collection for GCMMF. GCMMF sells its milk brand under the name of Amul.

Plant

The plant is a postmodernist brutalist building designed by Achyut Kanvinde. Commissioned in 1970, it was completed in 1973.

Timeline
Timeline:

1960 –  Rs 5,232/- were funded by Shri Mansinghbhai, with the help of which 11 milk societies produced  milk per day. Mehsana Milk Association was founded on 8 November 1960

1961 – Started supplying milk to Ahmedabad Municipal Dairy

1962 – Shri Mansinghbhai was voted into the working committee of the Sahkari Dairy and Animal Breeding program during the third 5-year plan

1963 – Foundation of Dudhsagar Dairy

1964 – Foundation of 'Milk Cold Storage' facility at Vihar

1966 – Shri Mansinghbhai attended the 17th international Dairy Conference.

Mobile Animal hospital was started

750 MT Powder was ordered for Soldiers

Mehsana District started receiving Pure Ghee

1967 – Shmt. Indira Gandhi visited the plant on 3 October 1967

1968 – Foundation of 'Milk Cold Storage' facility at Kheralu

'Dudhsagar Patrika' was started

Started transporting milk to Delhi

1969 – Sagardaan Factory at Boriawi was inaugurated by then Chief Minister Shri Hitendrabhai Desai

1970 – Shri Mansinghbhai passes away on 30 September 1970

The expansion project was inaugurated on 4 November 1970

Dairy started producing Baby Food with ISO mark

1971 – M.I.T was inaugurated on 14 January 1971 when the plant was producing  of milk on a daily basis, which was double the plant's original capacity

1972 – Foundation of second powder plant

Milk distribution started in Major states of India, including Mumbai, under the brand name 'Sagar'.

On 2 April 1972, Dairy celebrated its 11th anniversary in the presence of Sir Richard Tehan, Marketing Head of U.K Milk and International Dairy Foundation Speaker

1973 – Inauguration of 'Milk Cold Storage' facility at Hansapur

Gujarat Milk Marketing Federation Ltd. was started

Statue of Late Shri Mansinghbhai Pruthviraj was unveiled by Shri Morarji Desai

1974 – Foundation of a new Powder Plant

1975 – Cattle Breeding Centre started at Jagudan, Mehsana

Foundation of 'Milk Cold Storage' facility at Kadi, Mehsana

1976 – Foundation of 'Milk Cold Storage' facility at Harij

1977 – Animal insurance program started

Banas Dairy started under the support and guidance of Dudhsagar Dairy

1978 – 'Milk Pouch Packaging' started

1979 – Milk production capacity increased from 254000 litres to 450000 litres on a daily basis

1980 – Wireless project for Animal Treatment started

1981 – Sagardaan Factory at Ubkhal was inaugurated

1982 – 'Milk Production Plant' at Dudhsagar Dairy was expanded considering the high demand of milk supply

1983 – Dudhsagar receives a Gold Medal from the Institute of Defense and National Character. New offices and staff quarters set up

1984 – Animal fair planned and Inauguration of fourth powder plant.

1985 – Savings Plan started for the benefits of Dairy Councilors.

1991 – Highest amount of milk production per day achieved with 119.4 mn litres of milk produced at Dushsagar Dairy

1992 – 500 Grams Ghee Pouches launched in Market under the brand name "SAGAR"

1993 – S.C.M plant started, Tetrapack ghee launched in the market

1994 – 1000th Milk Society established

2000 – Received ISO and HACCP accreditations

2001 – 'Sagar Sfruti', a flavored milk brand introduced in the Market

2003 – Mass Cattle Deworming Program for cattle started

2004 – Inauguration of Dudhmansagar Dairy

2005 – Shri Motibhai Chaudhry passes away

2006 – Protest against increased gas prices

The Milk Plant Visit program started for Women

2007 – Reached BulkCoolers 100 in number

2008 – Milk Societies accredited with ISO. Total 85 Societies registered

2009 – ISO accreditation for all the milk societies belonging to the Union

Animal Insurance increased by 100%

508th Artificial Insemination center started

40,000 women benefited under Sagar Darshan Plan

2011 – Currently approx. 800000 litres of milk collected from Rajasthan, Haryana, Uttar Pradesh, and Punjab on a daily basis and is processed at Sudhmansagr dairy at Manoras, later distributed in Delhi/NCR market

Foundation of an upcoming dairy plant, "Dudhmotisagar" with the capacity of 3 million litres of milk per day, is in process at Haryana

2012 – 'Mansinghbhai Institute of Food And Dairy Technology' started to educate students in Dairy Technology, and in the first year of college 32 students enrolled, out of which 14 were girls

"Sagar Moti" and "Amul Moti" Milk Pouches launched in the market with milk that can be stored up to 30 days

Cattle Fodder production factory with a capacity of 1000 metric ton setup at Jagudan and inaugurated by Hon. Chief Minister of Gujarat, Shri Narendrabhai Modi

"Amul Diamond" pouch introduced in the market

A new dairy plant with a capacity of  3 million litres of milk per day was set up at Dudhmotisagar Dairy, Dharuhera, Rewari (Haryana) and was inaugurated by the Chief Minister of Haryana, Shri Bhupender Singh Hooda

The facility at Hansapur was renovated and was inaugurated by Revenue Minister Shrimati Anandiben Patel

2013: Change of Milk Chilling center into Dudhvidhyasgar Dairy at Kadi.

Inauguration of Dr. V Kurien Academic Centre.

Change of Milk Chilling centre at Hansapur into Dudhsagar dairy Patan.

Establishment of Mehsana Buffalo Breeder’s Association.

Manufacture new SCM plant at Mehsana for 20 metric tons per day

Anandiben Patel.

Packaging of Amul Tazza milk in 500 mL Pouch and 200 mL pouch at Dudhsagar dairy, Mehsana.

Commencement of transportation of processed milk from Hansapur chilling center (Patan dairy) to Dudhmansagar dairy, Manesar and Dudhmotisagar Dairy, Dharuhera.

2018: Highest milk procured @ 40.25 lac litre on 12th Jan 2018.

Dudhmotisagar dairy, Dharuhera,

Recognition as first runners up by Indian dairy association, north zone for the best, well equipped, clean and hygienic dairy in northern part of india.

Accreditation of ISO certification ISO 9001:2015.

2019: Conferment of CSR excellence TV-9 award by Chief Minister of Gujarat, Shri. Vijaybhai Rupani on 16 February 2019.

Dudhsagar dairy, Mehsana,

Distribution of “SAILAGE” to milk producers on no-profit / no-loss basis.

Dudhmansagar dairy, Manesar,

Launched pure cow and pure buffalo milk.

Launched traditional “RABDI” in Delhi market.

Products 
Dudhsagar Dairy makes various products, listed below:

 Amul Gold
 Amul Shakti
 Amul Butter
 Amul/Sagar Ghee
 Amul Cow Ghee
 Amul Mithai Mate
 Sagar Skimmed Milk Powder
 Amulya
 Amulspray
 Amul / Sagar Moti
 Sagar Sfurti
 Sagar Chhash
 Amul Kool: Amul Kool Kesar, Amul Kool Rose, Amul Kool Badam, Amul Kool Elaichi
 Amul Moti
 Frozen Yoghurt
 Masti Dahi
 Amul Lite
 Ice Cream

References

 Dudhsagar Dairy to invest Rs 350 cr in new plant, Times of India
 Amul row: Mehsana Union hits back at GCMMF MD, Business Standard
 Mehsana milk body taking Amul model beyond Gujarat, The Hindu
 Massive protest by dairy farmers, Times of India
 Chaudhary gets HC breather for now, Times of India
 Probe corruption allegations at Mehsana Dairy: High court, Times of India
 Amul row: HC extends stay on no-trust motion, Times of India
 GCMMF board to meet on 5 December, Times of India
 GCMMF row in reaches SC; probe govt starts inquiry at at (sic) Mehsana dairy, Times of India
 Mehsana's Dudhsagar Dairy achieves Rs 4,254 crore turnover, Times of India

External links

Dairy products companies of India
Companies based in Gujarat
Mehsana
Dairy cooperatives in India
Cooperatives in Gujarat
Food and drink companies established in 1963
1963 establishments in Gujarat
Indian companies established in 1963